Major-General Reginald Geoffrey Stirling Hobbs CB DSO OBE (8 August 1908 − 7 November 1977) was a British Army officer who became Commandant of the Royal Military Academy Sandhurst.

Early life
Hobbs was the eldest son of Brigadier-General Reginald Francis Arthur Hobbs (1878–1953) and Frances Graham Stirling, daughter of Sir William Stirling. His brothers, Major Peter Graham Hobbs (1911–1942) and Lieutenant Colonel William Paul Hobbs (1914–1943), were both killed in action in the Second World War.

Military career
Hobbs was commissioned into the Royal Artillery in 1928. He played rugby for England against South Africa at Twickenham in 1932 and then served in India. He fought in World War II becoming Commanding Officer of 104th Regiment (Essex Yeomanry), Royal Horse Artillery in the Western Desert taking part in the Battle of El Alamein in 1942 and then being deployed to North West Europe as a General Staff Officer.

After the War, he was Chief of Staff for Combined Operations. Then in 1950, he became Commander Royal Artillery for 1st Division in the Middle East. He was made Commander of 2nd Infantry Brigade in 1951, Commandant of the Royal Military Academy Sandhurst in 1954 and Director of the Royal Artillery at the War Office in 1957. He went on to be General Officer Commanding 1st Division in 1959 before retiring in 1960.

In retirement he was President of the Regular Commissions Board, Honorary Colonel of the Essex Yeomanry and Colonel Commandant of the Royal Artillery from 1963 to 1968. He lived at Lerags House in Oban in Argyllshire.

References

External links

|-

1908 births
1977 deaths
Burials in Surrey
People from Elham, Kent
British Army major generals
Royal Artillery officers
Essex Yeomanry officers
Companions of the Order of the Bath
Companions of the Distinguished Service Order
Officers of the Order of the British Empire
Commandants of Sandhurst
England international rugby union players
British Army personnel of World War II
Military personnel from Kent